Steve Parr (born 1955) is a New Zealand-based former TV and radio personality.

Parr was a presenter on the children's TV show What Now during the years 1983 to 1984. From 1989 to 1995, Parr then hosted the New Zealand edition of Sale of the Century alongside Judith Dobson and later Julie White.

After retiring from broadcasting, Parr ventured in real estate, and later a business specialising in elevated photography.

See also

 List of New Zealand television personalities

References

External links

 

New Zealand television presenters
New Zealand radio presenters
Living people
1955 births
New Zealand game show hosts